Spy Hunter II is an arcade game released by Bally Midway in 1987 as sequel to 1983's Spy Hunter. Unlike its popular predecessor, Spy Hunter II was not ported to any contemporary systems and remained obscure. George Gomez, who designed the original, was critical of the sequel made by the studio without his involvement.

Gameplay
The gameplay is similar to the original Spy Hunter but takes place in a 3D overhead behind the car view. The player can obtain several weapons just like in the original Spy hunter such as oil slicks, missiles and smoke screen. The game also includes a two player co-operative mode where the players can help each other out. The arcade cabinet uses a single monitor divided by a bezel and two steering wheels. Both the cabinet and in-game design were previously seen in Bally Midway's Max RPM, released the year before.

Legacy
Spy Hunter II was included on the collection Midway Arcade Treasures 2. The game was also included in the 2012 compilation Midway Arcade Origins for PlayStation 3 and Xbox 360.

References

1987 video games
Arcade video games
Arcade-only video games
Spy Hunter
Vehicular combat games
Midway video games
Video games developed in the United States